As of December 2007 there are some 50,000 detainees in Iraq, many of them untried and not accused of any crime.
Iraqi authorities hold 24,000 detainees and the United States 26,000. Critics say only a small proportion of those held are ever prosecuted.

Sunni Arab leaders have repeatedly called for the release of detainees in American custody, most of whom are Sunni Arabs held as suspected insurgents.

There has been a sharp increase in detentions since the United States 'surge' of mid-2007. Many prisoners are held without formal charges, and their fate is one of many sensitive issues believed to be complicating efforts to promote national reconciliation.

The Iraqi cabinet approved a draft law on December 26 that will offer a general pardon to thousands of prisoners in US military and Iraqi custody, a government spokesman said.
"The cabinet has passed the general pardon law, which will define who is eligible to be freed from all prisons, both Iraqi and American," spokesman Ali al-Dabbagh told Reuters.

A draft law approved by the government of Prime Minister Nouri al-Maliki aims to identify prisoners who would be eligible for release under a general pardon. The law would have to be approved by Iraq's parliament to go into effect.

Iraq's national security adviser, Mowaffaq al-Rubaie, said that the draft law was aimed at boosting reconciliation between majority Shi'ite and Sunni Arab Muslims.

The US military has said it intends to free most of its detainees by the end of 2008.

External links
 

 Human Rights First; Command’s Responsibility: Detainee Deaths in U.S. Custody in Iraq and Afghanistan

Iraq War